In Japan, an  is a car decorated with images of characters from anime, manga, or video games (especially bishōjo games or eroge). The decorations usually involve paint schemes and stickers. The cars are seen prominently in places such as Akihabara (Tokyo), Nipponbashi (Osaka), or Ōsu (Nagoya), or Itasha-based events, such as Odaiba Itasha Tengoku.

Itasha only applies to cars.

Etymology 
In the 1980s, when Japan was at the zenith of its economic might, Tokyo's streets were a parade of luxury import cars. Among them, the "itasha"—originally Japanese slang meaning an imported Italian car—was the most desired. Itai here means "painful", with additional senses of "painfully embarrassing" → "cringeworthy", "painful for the wallet" due to the high costs involved, or "painful to look at" (an eyesore).

History

The subculture started in Japan in the 1980s with character plushies and stickers, but only became a phenomenon in the twenty-first century, when anime culture became relatively well known via the Internet. The earliest known report of an itasha-decorated vehicle in convention was in August 2005, in Comiket 68.

Conventions
In 2007, the first , an itasha-oriented convention, was held in Ariake, near Comiket. Since then, the subculture has grown and allows people to express themselves and show off their customization to fellow friends and competitors. In 2019, Odaiba Itasha Tengoku, which took place in Odaiba, Tokyo, was also held. Another Itasha-JDM event was held on March 27th named "Itasha Tengoku JDM Paradise".

International movement

Similarly decorated vehicles have been found in Taiwan, the Philippines, Thailand, Malaysia, the United States, Brazil, Indonesia, and the United Kingdom.

Vehicles owned by character rights owner
The executive director of ACID Co., Ltd. (parent company of game developer Âge), Hirohiko Yoshida, was reported to own a Muv-Luv-themed Lamborghini Gallardo, Lancia Stratos, and BMW M5. The cars were unveiled in 2008 âge×Nitro+ in Akihabara UDX Gallery.

An official Macross Frontier-themed Suzuki Wagon R was unveiled in Macross Galaxy Tour Final. It was later redesigned for the Macross Super-Dimensional Space Launch ceremony.

Vehicles from automotive manufacturers

In Nagoya Auto Trend in 2009, a Phantom of Inferno-themed Chevrolet Corvette, a Melonbooks-themed MINI Cooper, and a Chaos;Head Noah-themed Toyota Estima were unveiled.

Licensed model vehicles
Officially licensed itasha cars can be found both in display and R/C car models.

In June 2008, Aoshima Bunka Kyozai launched "ITASHA" as one of their model car product lines. Since then, many model companies have produced various itasha versions of their car models. Fujimi, Kyosho, HPI and Tamiya also sell models with itasha decorations.

Recently, combinations between models and actual itasha are increasing, wherein models based on the original itasha were made afterwards.

Derivative uses

The itasha decorative style has also been found on railway cars, aircraft, computer cases, and other products. The itasha equivalent in apparel is the "ita-bag", a bag covered in fandom-related badges, buttons, etc.

In-vehicle electronics, such as navigation systems, were also reported to be customized with character voices. On 28 March 2008, Maplus began to offer character voices for its Maplus Portable Navi 2 GPS system, beginning with Shūichi Ikeda (Char Aznable from the Gundam franchise).

Automotive consumables such as motor oil have also been customized. On 20 June 2009, T&E, a tuning shop, began to sell scented semi-synthetic motor oil under the Itayu brand, with the first product being a Lucky Star-themed motor oil, unveiled at the 48th Shizuoka Hobby Show 2009.

See also
Art car
Moe
Dekotora – decorated trucks
Dekochari – decorated bicycles

References

External links 

 "Japanese 'itasha' gain in popularity in Taiwan" – article describing itasha in Taiwan, July 2008
 Itasha Graphics, the itasha-oriented magazine by Geibunsha 
 富士スピードウェイに痛車がっ！ 世界一痛いカーイベント！ ("Fuji Speedway hosts itasha! The most painful car event in the world!"), Ascii.jp report, May 2008 

1980s neologisms
2000s neologisms
Anime and manga fandom
Anime and manga terminology
Art vehicles
Japanese subcultures
Otaku slang
Decorated vehicles
Cars of Japan
Vehicle modification